An eight-ender, also called a snowman, is a perfect score within a single end of curling. In an end, both sides throw eight rocks, and in an eight-ender, all eight rocks from one team score points.

Eight-enders are extremely rare in competitive curling and are analogous to a perfect game in baseball, a perfect game in bowling (300) or a nine-dart finish in darts. Eight-enders are so rare that the Canadian Curling Association has an award to recognize any eight-ender scored in Canada.

The eight-ender in team curling is analogous to the six-ender in mixed doubles curling, as there is a total of six rocks in play per team instead of eight.

There has never been an eight-ender in Olympic competition, the closest being a 'seven-ender' scored by Great Britain's Eve Muirhead at the 2014 Winter Olympics, in a 12–3 round-robin stage victory over the United States. In mixed doubles curling, the maximum score of six has been achieved at the Olympics, with Switzerland's Jenny Perret and Martin Rios doing so against the United States in the last end of their 9–4 round-robin win at the 2018 Winter Olympics. Eight enders have never been scored at the Brier or Tournament of Hearts either, and was first scored at the World Curling Championships in 2021 by Switzerland.

Occurrences

Saskatchewan vs Quebec
At the 1952 Canadian Schoolboys Championship (now called the Canadian Junior Curling Championships), Saskatchewan's Gary Thode rink scored an eight ender in the fifth end against Quebec, (skipped by Gilles St. Hilaire) to take a 14–2 lead. To score eight, a nervous Thode had to hit and stick a Quebec stone in the back 12. In those days, it was not the custom for teams to concede early, so they continued to play all 10 ends, with Saskatchewan going on to win the match 17–5. To date, it has been the only eight-ender in Canadian juniors history. Saskatchewan went on to win the tournament.

Consecutive eight-enders
In 1993, the team of Kim Gellard, Corie Beveridge, Lisa Savage, and Sandy Graham recorded two consecutive eight-enders.

Scott vs King

One of the most famous eight-enders occurred at the 2006 Players' Championships in Calgary, Alberta, on April 15, 2006. The tournament was the final Grand Slam event in the 2005-06 Grand Slam of Curling and had a CAD$100,000 purse – one of the largest in women's curling.

The match between Kelly Scott, who at the time was the reigning Canadian women's champion and went on to become a world champion, and Cathy King a former world bronze medallist. In the 6th end of their match, King and her rink played rather poorly, while Scott and her rink capitalized on King's mistakes. King ricocheted her final stone out the side of a crowded house, leaving Scott a draw for 8. Although her shot was heavy, Scott's rock came to a stop eighteen inches from the back of the house, enough to score her eighth point.

Leskiw vs Hamblin
Another notable eight-ender occurred on January 22, 2011 at the MCA Bonspiel, the world's largest bonspiel. In this match Leskiw stole his eight points. In curling, when the team that does not have last rock in the end scores, the points scored are termed as stolen points. In this game, Leskiw managed an eight-ender even though Hamblin had the last rock, which gave him the opportunity to score or prevent Leskiw from scoring eight. In fact, Hamblin knocked Leskiw's eighth rock into the house with his final shot, turning a seven-point end into an eight-ender.

Jacobs vs. Phillips
2014 Olympic champion Brad Jacobs scored an eight-ender in the sixth end of the semi final of The Dominion 2012 Northern Ontario Men's Curling Championship against Tim Phillips in Sault Ste. Marie, Ontario. Jacobs had been leading 6–3 at the time, and had the hammer. After allowing the eight points, the Phillips rink conceded the game. On his last rock, Phillips ricocheted off two Jacobs stones, and out the rings, exposing one of his rocks that had been buried. Jacobs still had to make a delicate hit to ensure the Philips stone was removed, and he had to stick it to score his eight, which he did.

Einarson vs. McLean
Winnipeg's Kerri Einarson scored an eight-ender in the seventh end of her first round robin game at the 2015 Manitoba Scotties Tournament of Hearts against Tiffany McLean of Brandon in Winkler on January 21, 2015. Einarson's rink stole the eight points, after having scored five points the previous end. Einarson won the game by a total score of 16–3. The feat was the first time an eight-ender had been scored at the Manitoba Scotties in recorded history.

Australia vs. Hong Kong
The Australian men's team (skipped by Ian Palangio) scored an eight-ender in the first end of their match against Hong Kong (John Li) at the 2015 Pacific-Asia Curling Championships. The Aussies went on to win the match 16–3, after Hong Kong conceded after seven ends. It was the first international event for Hong Kong.

Prince Edward Island vs. Nunavut
The Prince Edward Island women's team (skipped by Lisa Jackson) scored an eight-ender in the first end of their match against Nunavut (Angela Dale) at the 2015 Travelers Curling Club Championship, Canada's national curling club championship. P.E.I. went on to win the match 21–0, with Nunavut conceding after 6 ends (games at the Travelers are 8 ends in length). This was the first eight-ender ever scored at a national championship in Canada.

South Korea vs. Qatar
The South Korean's women's national team skipped by Kim Eun-jung scored an eight-ender in the first end of their match against Qatar (skipped by Mubarkah Al-Abdulla) at the 2016 Pacific-Asia Curling Championships. The Koreans went on to win the match 30–0 with Qatar conceding after six ends. It was the first international event for Qatar.

USA vs. Brazil
The United States women's national team skipped by Nina Roth scored an eight-ender in the sixth end of their first match against Brazil (skipped by Aline Gonçalves) at the 2017 Americas Challenge. The Americans went on to win the game 16–2 with the Brazilians immediately conceding after the 6th end. It was the first international event for the Brazilian women's team.

Tardi vs. Schneider
Tyler Tardi and his team from Langley stole an eight-ender in the second end of their game against Team Stephen Schneider of Vancouver in their final round robin game at the 2018 King Cash Spiel, an event on the World Curling Tour. Even though it was just the second end, Team Schneider conceded, losing the game 10–0. Tardi went on to win the event.

Switzerland vs. Denmark
The Swiss national women's curling team skipped by Silvana Tirinzoni scored an eight-ender in the seventh end of their game against Denmark's Madeleine Dupont at the 2021 World Women's Curling Championship. Already sitting seven, Swiss fourth Alina Pätz just needed a draw to the full twelve–foot or better for the eighth point. After her successful throw, Denmark conceded, with the final score of the match being 13–4. It was the first eight-ender scored in World Curling Championships history (men or women).

Italy vs. Nigeria
The Italian men's junior team skipped by Giacomo Colli scored an eight-ender in the first end of their game against Nigeria (skipped by Kamsiyochukwu Dike) at the 2022 World Junior-B Curling Championships. Italy went on to win the game 18–3. It was the first competition for the Nigerian junior team.

Rørvik vs. Zelingrová
Marianne Rørvik and her team from Oslo, Norway scored an eight-ender in the sixth end of their game against Team Alžběta Zelingrová of Prague, Czech Republic in their first round robin game at the 2023 Mercure Perth Masters. The game was tied 2–2 after the fifth end before the Norwegian team scored the eight ender to secure a commanding 10–2 victory.

References

Curling terminology
Perfect scores in sports